Bruce Wayne Herron (born April 14, 1954) is a former professional American football player who played linebacker for five seasons for the Chicago Bears of the National Football League. In December 2012, Herron and former players Raymond Austin and Gerry Sullivan filed a lawsuit against the NFL over their handling of concussions.

References

1954 births
Living people
People from Victoria, Texas
Players of American football from Texas
American football linebackers
New Mexico Lobos football players
Miami Dolphins players
Chicago Bears players